The 1971–72 season was FC Dinamo București's 23rd season in Divizia A. Dinamo had a modest season in the championship, ending only seventh. In the European Cup, Dinamo eliminated Spartak Trnava. What followed was a double loss against Feyenoord: 0–3 and 0–2.

Results

European Cup 

First round

Dinamo București won 2–2 on aggregate due to away goals

Second round

Feyenoord Rotterdam won 5-0 on aggregate

Squad 

Goalkeepers: Marin Andrei, Iosif Cavai, Mircea Constantinescu.

Defenders: Florin Cheran, Augustin Deleanu, Cornel Dinu, Vasile Dobrău, Dan Gașpar, Ion Nunweiller, Gabriel Sandu, Mircea Stoenescu.

Midfielders: Alexandru Mustățea, Radu Nunweiller, Viorel Sălceanu, Alexandru Sătmăreanu.

Forwards: Ion Batacliu, Alexandru Custov, Florea Dumitrache, Florian Dumitrescu, Emil Dumitriu, Mircea Lucescu, Doru Popescu.

Transfers 

Before the season, Dinamo transferred Alexandru Sătmăreanu (Crişul Oradea), Florian Dumitrescu (UTA) and Emil Dumitriu (Steagul Roşu). Alexandru Boc left for Rapid. Alexandru Custov was promoted from the youth team.

References 
 www.labtof.ro
 www.romaniansoccer.ro

1971
Association football clubs 1971–72 season
Dinamo